Uršuľa Kovalyk is a Slovak writer and playwright. She was born in 1969 in Kosice. She is best known for her novel The Equestrienne (2013), which won the Bibliotéka Prize in 2013, and was also nominated for the Anasoft Award and the EBRD Book Prize. In addition, she has written several short story collections, such as A Pure Animal (2018).

She is the co-founder and director of a theatre group for the marginalized, called Theatre Without a Home.

References

Slovak writers
1969 births
Living people